Kaizo ("kaizō", meaning "modification", "rebuild" or "reconfiguration") is a philosophy of game design, specifically platforming games, distinguished by a high degree of strictness placed upon the player's intended actions and movements through a level. This emphasis on precision, which manifests in the form of extremely-precise character movement (often enforced through subterfuge and purposefully hidden traps), asks the player to use high levels of skill and knowledge of the game's physics and engine in order to accomplish tasks. The philosophy is most closely associated with ROM Hacks of Super Mario World and with custom levels created in Super Mario Maker and Super Mario Maker 2, but has been cited as an influence in other fan-made and original game designs.

The term originally came from the Japanese ROM hacking scene, where Kaizo was used as a general term for all modified games.

Origin 
The creation of ROM hacks for Super Mario games began in 1987 with the release of the Tonkachi editor for the Japan-exclusive Famicom Disk System. While the device did not achieve commercial success, it included on one of its floppy disks a ROM hack called Tonkachi Mario, which can be considered a precursor to similar projects. Like later established hacks, Tonkachi Mario requires the player to be dedicated to understanding the quirks of the game engine, such as knowing about bugs in the programming in order to be able to pass through walls that are normally impassable. 

Kaizo Mario World - (Japanese: 自作の改造マリオ（スーパーマリオワールド）を友人にプレイさせる, meaning "I force my friend to play my Mario hack (Super Mario World)") - was released in 2007 by T. Takemoto on the Japanese platform NicoNico. The first hack to officially use the phrase "Kaizo" in the title, it introduced many elements that would become synonymous with the design style: "kaizo blocks" - invisible blocks that are placed precisely where a player believes they should jump in order to punish their assumption, auto-scrollers that constantly increase in speed, post-goal obstacles (known as "kaizo traps") that require the player to take a specific action before finishing, and "Ultra Star" - a level consisting of extremely precise platform jumps and switches.

Rise in popularity

Kaizo Mario World and Early YouTube 
T. Takemoto's video on NicoNico was reuploaded and shared on English-language Internet under the title Asshole Mario, and became a viral hit due to the extreme demands of the player and the humor in discovering all of the hidden traps. The first Let's Play has over 5.5 million views on YouTube,  and Takemoto released sequels in 2007 (Kaizo Mario World 2) and 2012 (Kaizo Mario World 3), with the latter in particular being considered one of the most difficult ROM hacks to date, mainly due to the heavily-modified Bowser fight which is entirely based on RNG.

Games Done Quick 
Many experienced players at the time assumed that the games were unlikely to be played through by human players, if at all, and that it was primarily a genre for tool-assisted speedrunning. As the games became more popular and accessible, however, more experienced players within the Super Mario World speedrunning community began to attempt the games as a way to challenge their skills and break the monotony of record grinding. This led to the feature of Kaizo Mario World 1 by dram55, a world-class runner of Super Mario World at Awesome Games Done Quick 2015 in 24 minutes and 36 seconds.

This run served as the springboard for the inclusion of Kaizo Super Mario World, Super Mario Bros. 3 and Super Metroid fangames in following events, including notable runs by GrandPooBear, MitchFlowerPower, OatsandGoats, and individual and relay races of both full hacks and custom-created levels. Kaizo inclusions in GDQ events have served to inspire many to both play and create kaizo games, as well as generate media for both the marathons and the community.

Super Mario Maker 
The ability for a player to make and play their own kaizo-style levels was extended to a much wider audience with the release of Super Mario Maker in 2015. Prior to this, all games such as Kaizo Mario World were made using Lunar Magic, a Super Mario World level editor, and distributed non-commercially via patches to players who applied them to legally-owned copies of the game and played them via emulator or through custom cartridges. 

With Mario Maker, creative tools were given directly to players, along with the distribution and means to share and access creators and levels quickly. This, combined with the high sales for the game worldwide, led to a surge in interest in Kaizo, as well as an influx of players and creators looking for people to showcase their work. Early examples of Kaizo levels reaching notable mainstream attention include the creations of PangaeaPanga, whose "Pit of Panga" series of levels, including "P-Break" and "U-Break," would set records for playthroughs, clear rate, and viewership.

Livestream popularity and community 
As Kaizo's popularity first started due to views and playthroughs uploaded to Youtube, it has continued in part through livestreaming and community participation on platforms such as Discord and Twitch. 

As the creation and distribution of ROM hacking is legally unable to be commercially monetized, many creators also participate in playthroughs and livestream events. Creators and players also come together to share new hacks, resources, and to mentor and encourage new creators within the genre. Kotaku describes the community as "friendly, competitive, and creative" with famous players alongside new players.

The popularity of the subgenre remains strong, especially on video platforms such as  Twitch and YouTube. Well-known content creators, such as ThaBeast721, CarlSagan42, ryukahr, Shoujo, and PangaeaPanga, have several hundred thousand subscribers and regularly have thousands of live viewers.

Design philosophy 
The primary attribute of Kaizo design philosophy is restriction - in contrast to regular platforming games, where players may have freedom to repeat and try multiple techniques to reach the desired objective, Kaizo design intentionally focuses on taking away time and opportunity from the player in order to force a specific solution and specific method of execution. 

Beekaay, SMW Central moderator, explains the motive and intent behind Kaizo design as follows:

 A hallmark of Kaizo gameplay is the frequent and repeated death of the player in the course of the playthrough, even by highly-skilled players. This constant cycle is considered part of the learning process, and many Kaizo games do not punish the player beyond a forced restart (that is, there is no reduction of score or limit on total lives). In a way, Kaizo hacks thus use a similar motivation as such arcade games, in which the frequent death was optimized by partly unfair game components; here, however, without asking the playing person to spend additional money.

Scholarly review 
Game design, mass communication, humanities, and new media scholars have used Kaizo design philosophies as a subject for analysis in the relationship between players, level designers, audiences and the motivations and rationale for making and playing video games.

Wilson and Sicart consider the Kaizo philosophy among examples of "abusive design" in video games - a deliberate, violent break with established conventions in game design and a resulting artistic approach to the medium:

Selected examples

Super Mario World 
At present, more than 720 Kaizo hacks of varying difficulty have been approved by SMW Central, which has hosted and approved Kaizo hacks since 2014.

Super Mario Bros. 3

Other notable examples

References

Further reading

External links 

 SMW Central - Primary home for Kaizo Super Mario World hacks and resources
 Maker Teams - Hub for Kaizo Super Mario Maker creators of varying interests and subgenres
 Metroid Construction - Primary home for Super Metroid hacks and resources

Fangames
Mario video games
Unofficial works based on Mario
Video game mods
Video game genres